Harboe's Brewery is a Danish brewery located in Skælskør, Denmark which was established in 1883. Harboes is an international beverage manufacturer with production facilities in three countries and business activities in more than 90 markets worldwide. They manufacture and market beverages and malt-based ingredients. The company has been family-owned and managed for five generations.

The company
Harboe Beer is a range of premium beer of Danish origin. Harboe Beer is distributed globally and is one of the best-selling brands in the Scandinavian beer market. Harboe's Brewery has subsidiaries in 5 countries and business activities in more than 90 markets worldwide.

Products

Beer
The Harboe Beer product range includes the following varietals of beer:
 Pilsner (4.6%)
 Classic (4.6%)
 Bear Beer (7.7%), a light, sweet and refreshing lager
 Dark (5.2%)
 Gold (5.9%)
 Extra Strong (12%)
 Clim8 — this beer is brewed with raw barley

Soft drinks
Harboe also produces soft drinks with several flavors:
Citronvand(carbonated lemonade)
Hindbærbrus(Raspberry Fizz)
Sport
Grøn Sodavand(Green Soda)
Cola

Notes

References

External links
 No more beer for brewery workers. Rate Beer. May 23, 2005.

Breweries in Denmark
Companies based in Slagelse Municipality
Danish companies established in 1883
Food and drink companies established in 1991
Family-owned companies